Joseph Leopold "Pat" Larochelle (September 22, 1891 – October 18, 1944) was a Canadian professional ice hockey player. He played one game with the Montreal Canadiens of the National Hockey Association. He was the uncle of Wildor Larochelle who also played with the Montreal Canadiens.

References

1891 births
1944 deaths
Canadian ice hockey goaltenders
Montreal Canadiens (NHA) players
Ice hockey people from Montreal